Probability theory and statistics have some commonly used conventions, in addition to standard mathematical notation and mathematical symbols.

Probability theory

 Random variables are usually written in upper case roman letters: X, Y, etc.
 Particular realizations of a random variable are written in corresponding lower case letters. For example, x1, x2, …, xn could be a sample corresponding to the random variable X. A cumulative probability is formally written  to differentiate the random variable from its realization.
 or  indicates the probability that events A and B both occur.
 or  indicates the probability of either event A or event B occurring ("or" in this case means one or the other or both).
σ-algebras are usually written with uppercase calligraphic (e.g.  for the set of sets on which we define the probability P)
Probability density functions (pdfs) and probability mass functions are denoted by lowercase letters, e.g.
Cumulative distribution functions (cdfs) are denoted by uppercase letters, e.g.
In particular, the pdf of the standard normal distribution is denoted  by φ(z), and its cdf by Φ(z).
Some common operators: 
 E[X] : expected value of X
 var[X] : variance of X
 cov[X, Y] : covariance of X and Y
 or

 , the conditional probability, is the probability of  given , i.e.,  after  is observed.

Statistics

Greek letters (e.g. θ, β) are commonly used to denote unknown parameters (population parameters).
A tilde (~) denotes "has the probability distribution of".
The arithmetic mean of a series of values x1, x2, ..., xn is often denoted by placing an "overbar" over the symbol, e.g. , pronounced "x bar".
Some commonly used symbols for sample statistics are given below:
the sample mean ,
the sample variance s2,
 the sample standard deviation s,
the sample correlation coefficient r,
the sample cumulants kr.
Some commonly used symbols for population parameters are given below:
the population mean μ,
the population variance σ2,
 the population standard deviation σ,
the population correlation ρ,
the population cumulants κr,

Critical values

The α-level upper critical value of a probability distribution is the value exceeded with probability α, that is, the value xα such that F(xα) = 1 − α where F is the cumulative distribution function. There are standard notations for the  upper critical values of some commonly used distributions in statistics:
zα or z(α) for the standard normal distribution
tα,ν or t(α,ν) for the t-distribution with ν degrees of freedom
 or F(α,ν1,ν2) for the F-distribution with ν1 and ν2 degrees of freedom

Linear algebra

Matrices are usually denoted by boldface capital letters, e.g. A. 
Column vectors are usually denoted by boldface lowercase letters, e.g. x.
The transpose operator is denoted by either a superscript T (e.g. AT) or a prime symbol (e.g. A′).
A row vector is written as the transpose of a column vector, e.g. xT or x′.

Abbreviations

Common abbreviations include:
a.e. almost everywhere
a.s. almost surely
 cdf cumulative distribution function
 cmf cumulative mass function
df degrees of freedom (also )
i.i.d. independent and identically distributed
pdf probability density function
pmf probability mass function
 r.v. random variable
 w.p. with probability; wp1 with probability 1
 i.o. infinitely often, i.e. 
 ult. ultimately, i.e.

See also 
Glossary of probability and statistics
Combinations and permutations
History of mathematical notation

References

External links 
 Earliest Uses of Symbols in Probability and Statistics, maintained by Jeff Miller.

 Notation
Mathematical notation